Gay Lib v. University of Missouri, 558 F. 2d 848 (8th Cir. 1977) was a court case in 1977 about discrimination in student group recognition at state universities, namely the University of Missouri. The case reached the United States Court of Appeals for the Eighth Circuit. The courts determined that "the University, acting here as an instrumentality of the State, has no right to restrict speech or association 'simply because it finds the views expressed to be abhorrent'."

References

LGBT rights in Missouri
LGBT history in Columbia, Missouri
20th century in Columbia, Missouri
United States LGBT rights case law
United States Court of Appeals for the Eighth Circuit cases
1977 in United States case law
University of Missouri
1977 in LGBT history